10/8 may refer to:
October 8 (month-day date notation)
August 10 (day-month date notation)
10 shillings and 8 pence in UK predecimal currency